Publius Acilius Attianus (1st – 2nd century AD) was a powerful Roman official who played a significant, though obscured, role in the transfer of power from Trajan to Hadrian.

Life
He was born in Italica, Hispania Baetica, which was also the birthplace of Publius Aelius Hadrianus Afer, the emperor Hadrian's father. When Afer died about 86, Attianus and the future Emperor Trajan (another native of Italica) became the ten-year-old Hadrian's guardians. Otherwise nothing is known of Attianus's early career, but towards the end of Trajan's reign he was joint Praetorian Prefect with Servius Sulpicius Similis. While Similis remained at Rome, Attianus accompanied the Emperor on campaign in the East.

Imperial succession
Shortly before his death, Trajan was said to have composed a letter naming Hadrian as his adopted son and successor. Suspicions were raised because the copy of the letter that reached Rome bore Plotina's signature. It was rumoured that Attianus and the Empress Plotina had been lovers, both very fond of Hadrian their ward, and both present at Trajan's deathbed at Selinus in Cilicia in August 117, the two helped secure Hadrian's succession by forging Trajan's will.

Along with Plotina and Matidia, Attianus accompanied Trajan's body to Seleucia and his ashes to Rome.

During Hadrian's reign
Early in Hadrian's reign, Attianus counselled the emperor on his accession against various possible opponents, and, according to Hadrian's lost autobiography, was responsible for the murder of the ‘four consulars’ whose deaths were an early stain on his reign. However, the new emperor resented Attianus's power, and, in 119, induced him to request to be relieved of the post of Praetorian Prefect. Attianus was given senatorial rank and the ornamenta consularia on his retirement, but nothing more is heard of him past that point.

References

Attianus, Publius
1st-century births
2nd-century deaths
2nd-century Romans
Praetorian prefects
Romans from Hispania
Senators of the Roman Empire